Charles D. "Bo" Spearman (January 14, 1913 – September 8, 2000) was an American football and baseball coach.  He was the head football at Arkansas Agricultural, Mechanical & Normal College—now known as the University of Arkansas at Pine Bluff—from 1956 to 1961, compiling a record of 21–35–2.

Head coaching record

Football

References

External links
 

1913 births
2000 deaths
Arkansas–Pine Bluff Golden Lions baseball coaches
Arkansas–Pine Bluff Golden Lions football coaches
LeMoyne Magicians football players
African-American coaches of American football
African-American players of American football
African-American baseball coaches
20th-century African-American sportspeople